Es, ES, or similar may refer to:

Arts and entertainment
 An alternate name for the musical note E♭ (E-flat)
 E's, a manga series by Satoru Yuiga
 Es (film), the German title of It, a 1966 West German film directed by Ulrich Schamoni
 ES (Eternal Sabbath), a manga by Fuyumi Soryo
 ES, a supplement of the Evening Standard newspaper
 Es, a fictional character from the BlazBlue series

Businesses, organizations, and products
 Gibson ES Series, a line of guitars
 Lexus ES, a series of automobiles
 E-mini S&P, a futures contract on the Chicago Mercantile Exchange (symbol ES)
 Eurostar (National Rail abbreviation ES)
 DHL International Aviation ME (IATA airline code ES)

Language
 Es, a phonetic spelling of the Latin alphabet letter S
 -es, a word ending
 Spanish language (ISO 639 alpha-2 language code)
 Es (cyrillic), a letter in the Cyrillic alphabet that looks like the Latin letter C

Places
 Spain (ISO 3166-1 country code)
 El Salvador (FIPS 10-4 country code)
 Espírito Santo, a state in Brazil (ISO 3166-2:BR code)
 Eš, a village in the Czech Republic
 ES, an abbreviation for "elementary school", as seen on some maps, etc. (e.g., Matsukage ES, Yawatahama, Japan)
 CIA cryptonym for Guatemala

Science and technology

Chemical element Es
 Einsteinium, first made in 1952 (atomic number: 99)
 Hesperium (or Esperium), misidentified as an element in 1934

Computer software
 Es (operating system), developed by Nintendo, then Google
 es (Unix shell), a command-line interpreter
 Expert system, to automate decision making

Other computing uses
 .es, the top-level Internet domain for Spain
 ES EVM, a Soviet series of IBM computer clones
 ES register, in x86 computer architecture
 ECMAScript, popularly known as JavaScript
 Elasticsearch, a search engine
 Elementary stream, part of the MPEG communication protocol

Units of measure
 Exasecond (Es), an SI unit of time (greater than all elapsed time)
 Exasiemens (ES), an SI unit of electric conductance

Other uses in science and technology
 Edison screw, a type of lightbulb socket (e.g. ES14, ES27)
 Embryonic stem cell, in biology, from a fertilised ovum
 Electronic support, in military telecommunications

Other uses
 Es, the German term for the id, one of the psychic apparatus defined in Sigmund Freud's structural model of the psyche
 Série économique et sociale, a specialization within the French academic "baccalauréat" degree
 Expected shortfall, a measure of risk

See also
ES engine (disambiguation)